Yongxing Island Airport , also known as Woody Island Airport, is a civilian-military dual-use airport located on Yongxing (Woody) Island, the largest of the disputed Paracel Islands in the South China Sea. Yongxing/Woody Island is occupied and administered by China (PRC) as the seat of Sansha city of Hainan Province. The airport was expanded in 1990 to increase the combat range of Chinese warplanes. Further construction and reclamation of land commenced in 2012 to lengthen the airstrip. This work was completed in October 2014.

Military drills with fighter aircraft landing and taking off at Yongxing Island Airport were carried out and telecast on CCTV in December 2017.

Facilities
The airport has four hangars, a radar navigation station and four large fuel tanks, enabling it to serve as a forward deployment base for refueling warplanes on combat missions. A two storey  terminal building with control tower is found on south side of the runway. It has a domestic arrival and departure areas. The terminal has three gates to handle civil airliners.

Airlines and destinations

See also

Dongsha Island Airport (Pratas Island)
List of airports in the Spratly Islands
List of airports in China
List of People's Liberation Army Air Force airbases

References

External links
Aerial photos of Yongxing Island and the airport

Airports in Hainan
Chinese Air Force bases
Airports established in 1990
1990 establishments in China
Paracel Islands